Adelaide Luvenia Sanford (born November 27, 1925) is an American leader, scholar, activist administrator, public speaker, and national advocate for African-centered education for students of African descent. She has been in the field of education for over 35 years as an educator, education activist, activist, principal, community organizer, and Vice Chancellor Emerita, Board of Regents University of the State of New York. She served on the Board of Regents of the University of the State of New York from 1986 to 2007.

She is the founder of the Board of Education of People of African Ancestry, and was instrumental in its development and growth. She taught education courses at Baruch College, and at Fordham University. She has been a consultant for the boards of education in Niagara Falls, Connecticut, Indiana, and New Jersey. She has served on advisory committees for multicultural education for the National Associate of State Boards of Education. She has also served on the board of the Upper Manhattan Empowerment Zone. Adelaide, and her late husband, Dr. Jay Sanford, were organizers for the creation of the John Henrik Clarke House in Harlem, and Elders House in Selma, Ala. Adelaide is the founder of the 'Sanford and Hines Families Award for Study and Research in the African Experience in New York State, the Americas and the Diaspora'which was started in 2011. The first recipient of the award was Mandingo Tshaka in 2011. Adelaide and Jay Sanford were  married for 56 years. He died in 2011.

Career
Adelaide's teaching career started at P.S. 28 in Bedford–Stuyvesant, Brooklyn. She has been a teacher, assistant principal, and principal at P.S. 21 Crispus Attucks School in Brooklyn, New York. She played an instrumental role in the development of Crispus Attucks School along with Renee Young, Harold Anderson, and Alice Uzoaga. The school is named after Crispus Attucks. He was an American stevedore of African and Native American descent. In history, he is regarded as the first person killed during the Boston Massacre, being the first American to be killed in the American Revolution.

She has taught education courses at Baruch College, Mercy College (New York) and Fordham University in New York City. She was a visiting education practitioner and teaching fellow at the Principals' Center at Harvard University, Graduate School of Education.

In 1986 she became Member-At-Large for the Board of Regents of the State of New York. She was re-elected for a second term in 1993, and again in 2000 for a five-year term. In 2001 Adelaide was elected as Vice Chancellor of the Board of Regents.

In 1990 Adelaide founded the Board for The Education Of People Of African Ancestry (BEPAA), an organization that provides programs and services for students, parents and educators. When explaining her rationale for founding (BEPAA), she said,  "There was a Jewish Board, a Catholic Board, all these Boards—yet nothing to represent and stand for us. It had to be done."

In 2006, over 1000 community leaders, educators, and residents in Central Brooklyn came together for a Black Brooklyn Empowerment Convention. The convention was held to address community issues related to education, employment, health, housing, and quality of life issues in Central Brooklyn. School and education disparities were a core concern at the convention. A recommendation to formulate an organization around this concern grew out of the meeting with the creation of the Adelaide Sanford Institute to honor Adelaide Sanford. In 2012, the Adelaide L. Sanford Institute (ASI) started community-round table discussions in Central Brooklyn. The goal of the round-table discussions was to provide community based organizations, elected officials, parents, clergy, and community leaders with a forum for discussions and strategies around State Standards in New York City public schools.

Awards
 Congressional Black Caucus Foundation's humanitarian award
 Distinguished alumna award from Brooklyn College
 Distinguished alumna award from Wellesley College
 Josephine Shaw Lowell Award
 Ellen Lurie Award
 Honored in 2014 State of New York Resolution - Achievement Award
 Lifetime Achievement Award

Honorary Doctorate Degrees
 Mercy College
 The Bank Street College of Education
 Five Towns College
 St. John's University

Quotes
 I try to get children to internalize discipline, so we don't have to tell them what not to do."

 "We took every White image off the walls [at PS 21]. George Washington, Abraham Lincoln and more," reflected Dr. Sanford. "Those people made war, and we were teaching our children not to fight. We had to have images on our walls of peacemakers." 
"I wear beads and bangles in my hair to represent the okra seeds and yam tubers our ancestors kept in theirs as they traveled here from home," she said gently but powerfully. "We must pass on these things to the next generation, and always give them something to hold onto." Adelaide Sanford

See also
 Dr. Adelaide Sanford and the Story of John Hernrik Clarke House 
 Dr. Adelaide Sanford - The Great Harlem Debate - December 14, 2008

References

External links
Adelaide L. Sanford Charter School Highlights.mp4
Dr. Adelaide L. Sanford - Afrocentric Education As A Human Right - 5/19/2013
Teaching African American Students To Read And Write: Dr. Adelaide L. Sanford
Adelaide SanfordOn the C-SPAN Networks

African Americans in New York City
African-American educators
Education activism
1925 births
Living people
Mercy College (New York) alumni
Mercy College (New York) faculty
Brooklyn College alumni
21st-century African-American people
20th-century African-American people